KENI (650 AM) is a radio station broadcasting a news/talk format. Licensed to Anchorage, Alaska, United States, the station serves the south-central Alaska area. Its studios are located at Dimond Center in Anchorage, and its transmitter is located off Dowling Road in Southeast Anchorage.

KENI is a clear-channel, Class A, 50,000-watt station. The other Class A station on 650 AM is WSM in Nashville, Tennessee.

History
KENI began broadcasting May 2, 1948, on 550 kHz with 5 kW power (full-time), on what is now KTZN. It was operated by Midnight Sun Broadcasting Company. It moved to its current location in March 1998. During the mid-1990s, the station, as KYAK, was the Anchorage affiliate of the Radio AAHS children's format.

References

External links
 

 

1948 establishments in Alaska
IHeartMedia radio stations
Radio stations established in 1948
ENI
News and talk radio stations in the United States